Critic's Choice is a 1963 American comedy film directed by Don Weis. Based on the 1960 Broadway play of the same name by Ira Levin, the movie stars Bob Hope and Lucille Ball and includes Rip Torn, Marilyn Maxwell, Jim Backus, Marie Windsor and Jerome Cowan in the cast.

This is the last of four films that Hope and Ball made together.

Plot
Parker Ballantine is a theatrical critic, busily praising or disparaging the shows of Broadway. His wife Angela is feeling useless and restless, so she writes a play about her mother and sisters.

Angela doesn't believe Parker should review her work, since he will look prejudiced if he does so favorably and it will hurt her feelings if he knocks it. Parker has read it and isn't impressed. A major producer, however, decides to back it.

Handsome Dion Kapakos directs the play and tries to strike up a romantic interest in the playwright. Angela continues to resist, but she's getting more fed up with Parker's negativity by the hour.

Before the play's first out-of-town tryout in Boston, the conflicted Parker goes to see his ex-wife, Ivy, and gets a little tipsy. He decides to go to the opening, then writes a negative review. The trouble gets worse when he gets home.

Cast
 Bob Hope as Parker Ballantine
 Lucille Ball as Angela Ballantine
 Marilyn Maxwell as Ivy London
 Rip Torn as Dion Kapakos
 Jessie Royce Landis as Charlotte Orr aka Charlie
 John Dehner as S.P. Champlain
 Jim Backus as Dr. William Von Hagedorn
 Ricky Kelman as John Ballantine
 Dorothy Green as Mrs. Margaret Champlain
 Marie Windsor as Sally Orr
 Joseph Gallison as Philip 'Phil' Yardley (as Evan McCord)
 Joan Shawlee as Marge Orr
 Richard Deacon as Harvey Rittenhouse
 Jerome Cowan as Joe Rosenfield
 Donald Losby as Godfrey Von Hagedorn
 Soupy Sales as Boston Desk Clerk
 Jack Mower as Audience Member (uncredited)
 Rhoda Williams As Phone Operator (uncredited)
 Hal Smith as Drunk (uncredited)

Critical reception
The New York Times wrote, "It is pleasing to look at in its expensive décor, color and scope, ably played by its experienced stars and ingratiating in its quieter insights into a sophisticated marital relationship. So long as it meanders modestly through some above-average repartee, it provides an agreeable way to pass an evening. Instead of leaving well enough alone, unfortunately, the director, Don Weis, has tried to upholster the shaky plot with slapstick and broad burlesque...Both stars, old hands at this sort of thing, go through their paces with benign good humor, but their subtler comic talents remain untapped. At this rate, the critics' popularity seems unlikely to improve."

See also
 List of American films of 1963

References

Sources
 Martin, Mick and Porter, Marsha "DVD & Video Guide 2006"

External links
 
 
 
 
 
 The Shelf: Review of Critic's Choice

1963 films
1963 comedy films
American comedy films
Films scored by George Duning
Films about writers
American films based on plays
Films directed by Don Weis
Films set in Boston
Films set in New York City
Warner Bros. films
Films with screenplays by Jack Sher
1960s English-language films
1960s American films